The Hickory Creek Wilderness is a  wilderness area located on the Bradford Ranger District of the Allegheny National Forest in Warren County, Pennsylvania. It is one of only two designated wilderness areas in the forest and was created in October 1984.

Topography
The gentle to moderate terrain is drained by East Hickory Creek and Middle Hickory Creek.

Flora and fauna
Hickory Creek Wilderness is primarily characterized by black cherry and beech, with scattered hemlock and clumps of oak, maple and birch, with an understory of abundant flowers, ferns, shrubs, and mosses.  Large white pine can be found scattered in open areas. American black bear, white-tailed deer, wild turkey, barred owl, and pileated woodpecker are common in the Wilderness.  Small native brook trout can be found in both East Hickory and Middle Hickory Creeks.

Hiking trails
The Hickory Creek Wilderness contains several unofficial and unblazed trails, largely on old railroad grades, mostly along the scenic Middle and East Forks of Hickory Creek, though a 1985 tornado has made some sections impassable. The area also includes the maintained Hickory Creek Trail, an 11.6-mile loop, which mostly traverses high ground between the two branches of the creek. While maintained by volunteers, that trail is left in a largely primitive state per the rules of the federal Wilderness Area. A short segment of the Tanbark Trail crosses the eastern corner of the wilderness area.

See also
 List of U.S. Wilderness Areas
 Wilderness Act

References

External links
 Hickory Creek Wilderness - Allegheny National Forest
 Friends of Allegheny Wilderness

IUCN Category Ib
Wilderness areas of Pennsylvania
Protected areas of Warren County, Pennsylvania
Allegheny National Forest